Mimess is a local authority the Hasbaya District in Lebanon.

History 
In 1838, during the Ottoman era, Eli Smith noted the population of Mimis as being Druze and "Greek" Christians.

In 1875 Victor Guérin noted: "At nine hours fifteen minutes, I crossed the Wadi Mimas, which leads to the Wadi et-Teim. Beyond, to the north, rises, on a hill, the village of the same name. It is inhabited by Druses and schismatic Greeks. Some ruins on a mound next to this village, on the west side, are called Kharbet Ras A'ly".

References

Bibliography

External links 
 Mimess, Localiban

Populated places in Hasbaya District
Druze communities in Lebanon